Aqua Pura is a brand of mineral water drawn from Cumbria in the United Kingdom. Aqua Pura, in Latin, means "pure water". They are based in Armathwaite. They have an 8.2% share in the bottled water market, which puts them second to Evian, and is the UK's leading British Natural Mineral Water brand in the grocery market. They are currently worth around $9 million, and distribute around 1 million bottles at sporting events per year. They are owned by Roxane UK.

Products

Aqua Pura sell mineral water in several sizes. These are 330ml, 500ml, 750ml, 1.5 litre, 2 litre, 2 litre sparkling and 5 litre.

Sponsorship

Aqua Pura sponsors several events in the United Kingdom, sponsoring Race for Life, the Great Run series, and the Great Swim series. At the race for life series, there are exclusive pink bottles.

References

Bottled water brands